The ZE postcode area, also known as the Lerwick postcode area, is a group of three postcode districts covering the Shetland Islands in Scotland. The letters in the postcode are derived from Zetland, an archaic spelling of the islands' name that was the name for the council area until 1975.

Coverage
The approximate coverage of the postcode districts:

Map

The KW postcode area is situated to the southwest.

See also
Postcode Address File
List of postcode areas in the United Kingdom
Extreme points of the United Kingdom

References

External links 
 Royal Mail's Postcode Address File
A quick introduction to Royal Mail's Postcode Address File (PAF)

Shetland
Postcode areas covering Scotland